ETH Library is the largest public scientific and technical library in Switzerland.
As the central university library and knowledge hub of ETH Zurich, the ETH Library ensures the provision of scientific and technical information. Furthermore, it also offers resources for the public and for companies in research and development. Particular emphasis is placed on electronic information for university members and on the development of innovative services.

Collection focuses 
ETH Library collects media from the following fields:
Architecture
Building sciences
Engineering
Natural sciences and mathematics
System-oriented natural sciences
Management and social sciences

Special libraries 
ETH Library's four special libraries are responsible for supplying subject-specific literature to the corresponding departments and institutes at ETH Zurich. Their holdings are also generally available to the interested public. The special libraries include:
Architecture and Civil Engineering Library: architecture, urban and spatial planning; Material Collection: 
Earth Sciences Library: geosciences
GESS Library: humanities, social sciences, economics, law and politics
Green Library: agricultural and food science, environmental science

Collections and Archives 
ETH Library's Collections and Archives contain valuable original holdings of scientific and cultural-historical relevance. The Collections and Archives include: 
Rare Books: works from the 15th to the 20th century
#Image Archive: historical photographs, aerial photographs, press photographs, portraits, postcards and much more.
Earth Science Collections: fossils, minerals, rocks and reliefs
ETH Zurich's Collection of Prints and Drawings: Switzerland's largest collection of printed works
University Archives: Administrative Archives of ETH Zurich and the ETH Board, personal papers of scientists
Maps: historical and modern, topographical and topical maps 
Material Collection: building and historical materials
Max Frisch Archive: personal papers Max Frisch, primary and secondary literature
Cultural Assets Collection: art objects, art in architecture, the Sternwarte Collection
Thomas Mann Archive: personal papers Thomas Mann, primary and secondary literature

Image Archive

The Image Archive of ETH Library safeguards, indexes and mediates the library's image holdings. Its nationally and internationally significant image holdings document the development ETH Zurich, research expeditions to far-off lands, settlement development and changes in society, politics and technology in Switzerland. 
ETH Library's Image Archive was launched in 2000 as an ETH Library organisational unit. It curates a large number of image holdings that have been taken over by the library in recent decades, such as within the scope of academic legacies. Searches and online access to the Image Archive's digitized holdings via E-Pics Bildarchiv Online. A growing number of sub-holdings are also available on Wikimedia Commons. In the series Image Worlds (photographs from ETH Library's Image Archive), the archive's core holdings are presented thematically in texts and pictures.

Content-related focuses
ETH Library's Image Archive includes image holdings with a direct relation to the history of ETH Zurich and its architectural and staff development. In particular, this includes: 
scenes (from around 1860 onwards): historical photographs of buildings, institutes, lecture theaters and laboratories at ETH Zurich
portraits: portraits of former members and students of ETH Zurich and notable scientists
photograph collections from institutes at ETH Zurich: e.g. Geobotanical Institute/Rübel Foundation, Geological Institute, Institute of Aerodynamics, Institute of Building Conservation (Georg Mörsch) or the Photographic Institute
photographs and drawings from the personal papers of former professors at ETH Zurich: e.g. Albert Frey-Wyssling, Immanuel Friedlaender, Albert Heim, Arnold Heim, Robert Maillart, Leopold Ruzicka, Carl Schroeter, Leo Wehrli or Hans Leibundgut
The Image Archive has some extensive image holdings bearing a broader relation to science and technology and topics such as civil aviation, landscape and settlement development, (industrial) architecture or nature photography: 
Foundation Luftbild Schweiz Archive (1918–2011): aerial photographs by Walter Mittelholzer from flights over Switzerland and to Persia, South Africa, Chad, Abyssinia, Svalbard or as the first to fly over Kilimanjaro, portrait and landscape shots of Switzerland, taken by the Swissair Photo AG 
Swissair Photo Archives (1931–2001): photographs and films on civil aviation, the aviation business and aircraft and destinations of the former Swiss airline Swissair
Comet Photo AG Archive (1952–1999): media images on topics such as architecture, culture, nature, politics, prominence, sport, technology, transport with a relation to Switzerland
Scenes (from around 1860 onwards): landscapes and views of locations (primarily Switzerland)
Other private image holdings: Photo archive of the foundation Documenta Natura, photo archive of the Industriekultur Foundation of Dr Hans-Peter Bärtschi, aerial image archive of Air Color SA (Meyrin), nature photographs by Albert Krebs and orchid photographs by Hans R. Reinhard
The image materials serve as a primary information source and reference material for studies on image production and usage. Last but not least, the copies, negatives, glass slides and individual films also document the technical development of the image as a medium.

Selected key figures for ETH Library's holdings 
ETH Library's holdings comprise around 8 million analogue and around 550,000 digital resources. As of September 2021, these include:

Analogue resources 

Digital resources

The holdings of all ETH Zurich libraries, as well as more than 490 libraries across Switzerland, are available on ETH Library @ swisscovery. ETH Library @ swisscovery therefore provides access to more than 30 million books, series, journals and non-book materials.

Digital search platform

Research Collection
The Research Collection  is ETH Zurich's publication platform. University members can publish their scientific full texts open access as well as archive their research data and make them accessible to the public. Furthermore, the Research Collection records all publications produced at ETH Zurich and serves as a source for publication lists in the academic reporting and on ETH Zurich's websites.

Other nationally relevant platforms operated by ETH Library (a selection)
e-rara.ch: digitized prints from Swiss libraries from the 15th to the 19th century
e-manuscripta.ch: digitized handwritten sources from Swiss libraries and archives
E-Pics: digitized photographs, image documents and 3D scans from collections, archives, institutes and units of ETH Zurich and external partners 
E-Periodica: digitized Swiss journals in the fields of science and culture from the 18th century to the present day 
Thomas Mann: manuscripts and press articles on Thomas Mann

Selected services

Circulation courier
Library customers have the option of having documents from the institutions participating in Swiss Library Service Platform delivered to the library of their choice.

DOI Desk
ETH Zurich's DOI Desk is located at ETH Library and acts as a central DOI registration centre for universities and research institutions in Switzerland. This service is also provided in collaboration with DataCite.

Research Data Management and Digital Curation
The specialist Research Data Management and Digital Curation office advises researchers at ETH Zurich on aspects of handling research data and digital data in general. The ETH Data Archive provides the technical infrastructure for the electronic long-term archiving and publication of this data.

E-Publishing office
As a central contact point for open access within ETH Zurich, ETH Library helps members of ETH Zurich to publish their dissertations, articles, reports and much more in a freely accessible way online.

DigiCenter
"The Digitization Centre at the ETH Library is service provider and competence centre in the fields of digitization and the handling of metadata. In cooperation with various institutions of ETH Zurich and Swiss libraries, it carries out large-scale and high-quality digitization projects".

Ongoing projects
ETH Library conducts a number of future-oriented projects, which ensure that the service and product portfolio is geared towards the needs of the target groups".

References

External links
  
 ETH Library at ETHorama
 ETH Search Portal
 Website Image Archive
 ETH Zurich's Collections and Archives
 E-Pics Bildarchiv Online

Academic libraries in Switzerland
ETH Zurich
Swiss digital libraries